Marcq-en-Barœul (older ) is a commune in the Nord department in the Hauts-de-France region in northern France.

It is a suburb of the city of Lille, and is immediately adjacent to it on the northeast. It is the sixth-largest component of the Métropole Européenne de Lille. Marcq-en-Barœul is known as the most affluent suburb city of Lille, it is part of the 'Triangle d'or' (Golden triangle) of Lille. It features expensive real estate, especially alongside the Grand Boulevard and Hippodrome des Flandres racecourse. The city is also home to one of the campuses of the elite international private collège and lycée active bilingue Jeannine-Manuel.

Heraldry

Population

Economy
Groupe Holder and subsidiaries Ladurée and Paul have their head offices in the commune.

Sport
A racecourse field is located in the town where several races take place along the year.

Two golf courses are opened:
 Golf des Flandres, near the racecourse
 Cité golfe

Rugby 

Founded in 1971, the rugby club is called Olympique Marcquois Rugby. It is a section of the local multi-sports Club. The Club grew up quickly and join the honneur régional league in 1973. It was promoted in the upper league, Fédérale 3, in 1993 for the first time and again in 2002.

In 2006, the club was promoted in the Fédérale 2 league and remains in the same league up to now.

The rugby school is a strength of the club which welcomes 350 youngsters from 7 years old to 15 years old.

More than six hundred players and sixty volunteers belong to the Olympique Marcquois Rugby which is one of the most important clubs in the County.

The club is affiliated to the Stade Toulousain since 1999.

Twin towns - sister cities
Marcq-en-Barœul is twinned with:
 Ealing, England, United Kingdom
 Gladbeck, Germany
 Poggibonsi, Italy
 Kuurne, Belgium

See also

Communes of the Nord department

References

External links

 Official website
 OM Rugby web site

Marcqenbaroeul
French Flanders